King Tide may refer to :

 King tide, an especially high tide
 King Tide (album), a 1993 album by Weddings Parties Anything
 King Tide (band), an Australian reggae band
 King Tide, a 2007 play by Australian playwright Katherine Thomson

See also 
 King Canute and the tide